KDFM (103.3 FM) is a radio station broadcasting a Spanish music format. Licensed to Falfurrias, Texas, United States, the station serves the Kingsville-Alice-Falfurrias area. The station is owned by Cantico Nuevo Ministry Inc.

References

External links

DFM
Radio stations established in 1989